The Élysette is the executive seat of the Government of Wallonia. It houses the office of the Minister-President of Wallonia, and is located in Namur, Namur province, Belgium.

History 

Built in 1877 by master-tanner Xavier Thibault, it was bought by the Walloon Region to the city of Namur.

This building, hosting the office of the Minister-President, as well as his official residence, is on the right shore of the Meuse river, in Jambes, the administrative borough of Namur, capital of Wallonia. 
For the Minister-President's good services, you can find there kitchens, two bedrooms for the servants, garages, offices and meeting rooms (especially the Council of Ministers' Room).

A flat, consisting of a bedroom, a dining room, a bathroom and a living room is next to the Minister-President's Office. 

The Élysette faces the Parliament of Wallonia. This one is on the left shore of the river, next to the Grognon (confluence between Meuse and Sambre rivers).

Bibliography 
 L’Élysette : la présidence du Gouvernement wallon à Namur, Jacques Vandenbroucke, Namur : Institut du patrimoine wallon, 2010, 40 p.,  Carnets du patrimoine nº 76, .

History of Wallonia
Namur (city)
Buildings and structures in Namur (city)
Politics of Wallonia